Rhyssostelma is a species of plants in the family Apocynaceae first described as a genus in 1844. It contains only one known species, Rhyssostelma nigricans, endemic to Argentina.

References

Monotypic Apocynaceae genera
Endemic flora of Argentina
Asclepiadoideae